Bernie Wolfe may refer to:

 Bernie Wolfe (ice hockey) (born 1951), retired Canadian National Hockey League goaltender
 Bernie Wolfe (Holby City), a fictional character from the medical drama Holby City
 Bernie Wolfe Community School a school in the River East Transcona school division in Winnipeg, Manitoba